Love in the Time of Science is the third album by the Icelandic singer/songwriter Emilíana Torrini. It was her first album to be released internationally (her earlier albums being released only in her native Iceland).

The album was recorded and released in 1999, and was produced by Roland Orzabal and Alan Griffiths of Tears For Fears, who also wrote two tracks for the album. It was recorded and mixed at Orzabal's own studio, Neptune's Kitchen, with additional recording done in Spain and Iceland. Orzabal also played and performed backing vocals on the album.

Other collaborators included Eg White, Siggi Baldursson and Mark Abis.

The title of the album is a variation of the 1985 Gabriel García Márquez novel Love in the Time of Cholera.

Track listing

Singles
 "Dead Things"
 "Baby Blue"
 "To Be Free" (UK #44)
 "Easy" (UK #63)
 "Unemployed in Summertime" (UK #63)

References

1999 albums
Emilíana Torrini albums
One Little Independent Records albums
Virgin Records albums